Dustin Kohn (born February 2, 1987) is a Canadian former professional ice hockey player. He is currently working for the Saskatoon Blades in the Western Hockey League as a Hockey Advisor. Previously, he was a member of the New York Islanders organization of the National Hockey League (NHL).

Playing career
Kohn was born in Edmonton, Alberta, and played minor league hockey for the Knights of Columbus. He attended high school at St. Francis Xavier High School.

Dustin played Major junior hockey with the Calgary Hitmen of the Western Hockey League before he was selected in the second round, 46th overall of the 2005 NHL Entry Draft by the New York Islanders. In the following 2005–06 season, Kohn was traded from the Hitmen to the Brandon Wheat Kings and also made his professional debut, appearing in 2 games, after signing an amateur try-out contract with the Islanders AHL affiliate, the Bridgeport Sound Tigers.

On May 30, 2007, he was signed to a three-year entry level contract with the New York Islanders.

Kohn was called up to the New York Islanders on January 19, 2010, and made his NHL debut following a suspension to Islanders' defenseman Andy Sutton on a boarding hit on Pittsburgh Penguins forward Pascal Dupuis.

For the 2011-2012 season, Kohn signed a one-year contract with Örebro HK in Sweden's  Hockey Allsvenskan, the second highest league in the country.

After this season he remained in Europe, signing a contract with HC Energie Karlovy Vary of the Czech highest ice-hockey league, the Czech Extraliga.

On August 12, 2013, Kohn agreed to a two-year contract with United Kingdom club, the Sheffield Steelers of the EIHL.

Career statistics

Regular season and playoffs

International

References

External links

1987 births
Living people
Brandon Wheat Kings players
Bridgeport Sound Tigers players
Calgary Hitmen players
Canadian ice hockey defencemen
Ice hockey people from Edmonton
HC Karlovy Vary players
New York Islanders draft picks
New York Islanders players
Sheffield Steelers players
Örebro HK players
Canadian expatriate ice hockey players in England
Canadian expatriate ice hockey players in the Czech Republic
Canadian expatriate ice hockey players in Sweden
Canadian expatriate ice hockey players in the United States